The 1977 WCT Tournament of Champions, also known by its sponsored name Shakeys Tournament of Champions, was a men's tennis tournament that was part of the 1977 World Championship Tennis circuit. It was the first edition of the tournament and was held in Lakeway, Texas on 10–13 March (upper half of the draw) and 10–13 July (lower half of the draw), with the final played in the Madison Square Garden, New York on 17 September 1977. Harold Solomon won the title.

Final

Singles

 Harold Solomon defeated  Ken Rosewall 7–6, 6–2, 2–6, 0–6, 6–3

References

External links
ATP – 1977 results archive

WCT Tournament of Champions
WCT Tournament of Champions
World Championship Tennis Tournament of Champions